Quincy Adams station is a rapid transit station in Quincy, Massachusetts. It serves the Braintree Branch of the MBTA's Red Line. Located in southern Quincy on Burgin Parkway near the Braintree Split, the station features a large park and ride garage, with space for 2,538 automobiles, built over the station tracks and platforms. It is fully accessible.

History

Old Colony Railroad

The Old Colony Railroad had a South Quincy station at Water Street in southern Quincy. In December 1867, it was renamed Quincy Adams (after President John Quincy Adams, who was born nearby). A stone station building was constructed in 1869; it was identical to the still-extant station at Avon, which was built around the same time.

The 1926 Report on Improved Transportation Facilities and 1945–47 Coolidge Commission Report recommended the Cambridge–Dorchester line receive a branch to Braintree along the Old Colony right-of-way. Quincy Adams station closed along with the rest of the Old Colony system on June 30, 1959, and was later demolished.

Red Line opening
The MBTA received a $21 million federal grant (with $5 million local match required) in July 1976 for the construction of South Quincy station. The station (renamed Quincy Adams) opened on September 10, 1983 as an infill station on the Braintree Branch. Quincy Adams had been scheduled to open along with Braintree (which opened on March 22, 1980), but construction delays caused opening to be three years late.  The station has been accessible since at least 1989. The station ultimately cost $32 million to build.

From their openings until 2007, a double entry fare and single exit fare were charged at Quincy Adams and Braintree when leaving the subway, as a proxy for distance-based fares. The extra fares was discontinued as part of a fare increase and service change on January 1, 2007. Similar charges existed until 1980 for the inner stations on the Braintree Branch.

Renovations

Until 2012, access to the garage had only been from ramps off I-93 and Route 3, with the Burgin Parkway entrance leading only to a 160-space surface lot. In July 2012, after the closure of the garage at Quincy Center due to structural issues, the 130-space lower level of the garage was made accessible from Burgin Parkway as well.

Although built to last 50 years, the $28 million garage at Quincy Adams began suffering concrete damage due to water leakage and ill-fitting structural elements. Repairs were performed to the Quincy Adams and Braintree garages in the mid 1990s. In 2015, the MBTA began a $4.4 million project to address urgent structural issues with the two garages, though full repair or replacement was still needed. The garage is being fully renovated from May 2018 through December 2021 at a cost of $35 million; the station and garage were originally planned to remain open during the whole project. The garage was closed from October 5, 2020, to April 20, 2021, when it partially reopened.

A separate $10.5 million project, which began in August 2018, involves the replacement of the two existing garage elevators and single platform elevator plus the addition of a redundant platform elevator. One garage elevator was completed in late 2020, followed by the new platform elevator in 2021. The second garage elevator was completed in early 2022; the replacement of the existing platform elevator was completed in December 2022.

Independence Avenue entrance

Until December 2018, the only pedestrian access to the station was via the park and ride garage off Burgin Parkway. The MBTA opened a pedestrian entrance on the east side of the station leading to Independence Avenue in 1981. However, the streets surrounding that entrance were frequently used for parking by riders seeking to avoid paying for the parking garage. In the late 1980s, the entrance was closed, leaving neighborhood residents without station access. Some neighborhood residents climbed over the gate to use the station. The entrance was a point of contention between the cities of Quincy and Braintree; in February 2014, officials from the two towns proposed that a lock system be created where only nearby residents could enter from Independence Avenue.

The garage improvements included repairs to the pathway from Independence Avenue, but the MBTA claimed that the entrance was a "city issue" and did not plan to reopen it as part of the project. In April 2018, the city announced that the gate would be opened by September of that year. The gate was ultimately opened on December 3, 2018.

Bus service

The station was built with a large busway (bus transfer facility) for MBTA bus routes, with entry from Centre Street and exit to Burgin Parkway, but it has remained very underutilized throughout the history of the station. The busway has never served as a terminal for any MBTA bus route, and only route  uses it. (Route , which runs on Independence Avenue, also serves the station.) However, several other services have used the busway at various times.

The Quincy Adams service was considered successful and became permanent; it was later contracted to Plymouth & Brockton in November 1987. From 1988 to 1990, service continued past Quincy Adams to Plymouth. In November 1990, the terminal was moved from Quincy Adams to a parking lot near Braintree to free garage spots for MBTA commuters.

In February 1990, two special routes, 201 –Museum of Fine Arts and 202 Quincy Adams–Museum of Fine Arts, were run during a Monet exhibition at the museum. The service was operated by Bloom Bus Lines after it acquired Interstate in August 2003, but discontinued in July 2004.

Service from the latter three stations lasted until the 2000 season.

Station layout
A single track runs through the station carrying the Old Colony Lines and Greenbush Line of the MBTA Commuter Rail system, but there is no commuter rail platform and trains do not stop.

Notes

External links

MBTA – Quincy Adams
MBTA – South Shore Garages
Google Maps Street View: Burgin Parkway entrance, Centre Street entrance, Independence Avenue entrance

Red Line (MBTA) stations
Railway stations in Norfolk County, Massachusetts
Railway stations in the United States opened in 1983
Stations along Old Colony Railroad lines
Buildings and structures in Quincy, Massachusetts